The  is the official currency of Japan. It is the third-most traded currency in the foreign exchange market, after the United States dollar (US$) and the euro. It is also widely used as a third reserve currency after the US dollar and the euro.

The yen replaced the previous Tokugawa coinage as well as the various hansatsu paper currencies issued by feudal han (fiefs). The Bank of Japan was founded in 1882 and given a monopoly on controlling the money supply.

Following World War II, the yen lost much of its prewar value. To stabilize the Japanese economy, the exchange rate of the yen was fixed at ¥360 per US$ as part of the Bretton Woods system. When that system was abandoned in 1971, the yen became undervalued and was allowed to float. The yen had appreciated to a peak of ¥271 per US$ in 1973, then underwent periods of depreciation and appreciation due to the 1973 oil crisis, arriving at a value of ¥227 per US$ by 1980.

Since 1973, the Japanese government has maintained a policy of currency intervention, so the yen is under a "dirty float" regime. The Japanese government focused on a competitive export market, and tried to ensure a low exchange rate for the yen through a trade surplus. The Plaza Accord of 1985 temporarily changed this situation; the exchange rate fell from its average of ¥239 per dollar in 1985 to ¥128 in 1988 and led to a peak rate of ¥80 against the US$ in 1995, effectively increasing the value of Japan’s GDP in dollar terms to almost that of the United States. Since that time, however, the world price of the yen has greatly decreased. The Bank of Japan maintains a policy of zero to near-zero interest rates and the Japanese government has previously had a strict anti-inflation policy.

Pronunciation and etymology
Yen derives from the Japanese word , which borrows its phonetic reading from Chinese yuan, similar to North Korean won and South Korean won. Originally, the Chinese had traded silver in mass called sycees, and when Spanish and Mexican silver coins arrived from the Philippines, the Chinese called them "silver rounds" for their circular shapes. The coins and the name also appeared in Japan.

The spelling and pronunciation "yen" is standard in English because when Japan was first encountered by Europeans around the 16th century, Japanese  and  both had been pronounced  and Portuguese missionaries had spelled them "ye". By the middle of the 18th century,  and  came to be pronounced  as in modern Japanese, although some regions retain the  pronunciation. Walter Henry Medhurst, who had neither been to Japan nor met any Japanese people, having consulted mainly a Japanese-Dutch dictionary, spelled some "e"s as "ye" in his An English and Japanese, and Japanese and English Vocabulary (1830). In the early Meiji era, James Curtis Hepburn, following Medhurst, spelled all "e"s as "ye" in his A Japanese and English dictionary (1867); in Japanese, e and i are slightly palatalized, somewhat as in Russian. That was the first full-scale Japanese-English/English-Japanese dictionary, which had a strong influence on Westerners in Japan and probably prompted the spelling "yen". Hepburn revised most "ye"s to "e" in the 3rd edition (1886) to mirror the contemporary pronunciation, except "yen". Since 1946, the spelling "yen" is depicted on Japanese banknotes.

History

Introduction

Ōkuma Shigenobu was in charge of Japan's fiscal and foreign policy in the early Meiji period, and he worked with Inoue Kaoru, Itō Hirobumi, and Shibusawa Eiichito run the Ministry of Finance, seeking to introduce a modern monetary system into Japan. Ōkuma proposed that coins, which were previously square, be made into circles, and that the names of the traditional currencies, ryō (両), bu (分) and shu (朱), be unified into yen (円), which was accepted by the government.

On June 27, 1871, the Meiji government officially adopted the "yen" as Japan's modern unit of currency under the New Currency Act of 1871. While initially defined at par with the Spanish and Mexican dollars then circulating in the 19th century at 0.78 troy ounce (24.26 g) of fine silver, the yen was also defined as 1.5 grams of fine gold, considering recommendations to put the currency on the bimetallic standard. The new currency was gradually introduced beginning from July of that year.

The yen replaced the complex monetary system of the Edo period in the form of Tokugawa coinage as well as the various hansatsu paper currencies issued by Japan's feudal fiefs in an array of incompatible denominations. The former han (fiefs) became prefectures and their mints private chartered banks, which initially retained the right to print money. To bring an end to this situation, the Bank of Japan was founded in 1882 and given a monopoly on controlling the money supply.

Following the silver devaluation of 1873, the yen devalued against the US and Canadian dollars (since those two countries adhered to a gold standard), and by 1897, the yen was worth only about US$0.50. In that year, Japan adopted a gold exchange standard, defining the yen as 0.75 g fine gold or US$0.4985. This exchange rate remained in place until Japan left the gold standard in December 1931, after which the yen fell to $0.30 by July 1932 and to $0.20 by 1933. It remained steady at around $0.30 until the start of the Pacific War on December 7, 1941, at which time it fell to $0.23. The sen and the rin were eventually taken out of circulation at the end of 1953.

Fixed value of the yen to the U.S. dollar
No true exchange rate existed for the yen between December 7, 1941, and April 25, 1949; wartime inflation reduced the yen to a fraction of its prewar value. After a period of instability, on April 25, 1949, the U.S. occupation government fixed the value of the yen at ¥360 per USD through a United States plan, which was part of the Bretton Woods system, to stabilize prices in the Japanese economy. That exchange rate was maintained until 1971, when the United States abandoned the gold standard, ending a key element of the Bretton Woods system, and setting in motion changes that eventually led to floating exchange rates in 1973.

Yen and major currencies float
By 1971, the yen had become undervalued. Japanese exports were costing too little in international markets, and imports from abroad were costing the Japanese too much. This undervaluation was reflected in the current account balance, which had risen from the deficits of the early 1960s, to a then-large surplus of US$5.8 billion in 1971. The belief that the yen, and several other major currencies, were undervalued motivated the United States' actions in 1971.

Following the United States' measures to devalue the dollar in the summer of 1971, the Japanese government agreed to a new, fixed exchange rate as part of the Smithsonian agreement, signed at the end of the year. This agreement set the exchange rate at ¥308 per US$. However, the new fixed rates of the Smithsonian agreement were difficult to maintain in the face of supply and demand pressures in the foreign-exchange market. In early 1973, the rates were abandoned, and the major nations of the world allowed their currencies to float.

Yen adoption in Okinawa
After World War II the United States-administered Okinawa issued a higher-valued currency called the B yen from 1946 to 1958, which was then replaced by the U.S. dollar at the rate of $1 = 120 B yen. Upon the reversion of Okinawa to Japan in 1972 the Japanese yen then replaced the dollar. In light of the dollar's reduction in value from ¥360 to ¥308 just before the reversion, an unannounced "currency confirmation" took place on October 9, 1971, wherein residents disclosed their dollar holdings in cash and bank accounts; dollars held that day amounting to US$60 million were entitled for conversion in 1972 at a higher rate of ¥360.

Japanese government intervention in the currency market
In the 1970s, Japanese government and business people were very concerned that a rise in the value of the yen would hurt export growth by making Japanese products less competitive and would damage the industrial base. The government, therefore, continued to intervene heavily in foreign-exchange marketing (buying or selling dollars), even after the 1973 decision to allow the yen to float.

Despite intervention, market pressures caused the yen to continue climbing in value, peaking temporarily at an average of ¥271 per US$ in 1973, before the impact of the 1973 oil crisis was felt. The increased costs of imported oil caused the yen to depreciate to a range of ¥290 per US$ to ¥300 per US$ between 1974 and 1976. The re-emergence of trade surpluses drove the yen back up to ¥211 in 1978. This currency strengthening was again reversed by the second oil shock in 1979, with the yen dropping to ¥227 per US$ by 1980.

Yen in the early 1980s
During the first half of the 1980s, the yen failed to rise in value, though current account surpluses returned and grew quickly. From ¥221 per US$ in 1981, the average value of the yen actually dropped to ¥239 per US$ in 1985. The rise in the current account surplus generated stronger demand for yen in foreign-exchange markets, but this trade-related demand for yen was offset by other factors. A wide differential in interest rates, with United States interest rates much higher than those in Japan, and the continuing moves to deregulate the international flow of capital, led to a large net outflow of capital from Japan. This capital flow increased the supply of yen in foreign-exchange markets, as Japanese investors changed their yen for other currencies (mainly dollars) to invest overseas. This kept the yen weak relative to the dollar and fostered the rapid rise in the Japanese trade surplus that took place in the 1980s.

Effect of the Plaza Accord

In 1985, a dramatic change began. Finance officials from major nations signed an agreement (the Plaza Accord) affirming that the dollar was overvalued (and, therefore, the yen undervalued). This agreement, and shifting supply and demand pressures in the markets, led to a rapid rise in the value of the yen. From its average of ¥239 per US$ in 1985, the yen rose to a peak of ¥128 in 1988, virtually doubling its value relative to the dollar. After declining somewhat in 1989 and 1990, it reached a new high of ¥123 to US$ in December 1992. In April 1995, the yen hit a peak of under 80 yen/US$, temporarily making Japan's economy nearly the size of that of the US.

Post-bubble years
The yen declined during the Japanese asset price bubble and continued to do so afterwards, reaching a low of ¥134 to US$ in February 2002. The Bank of Japan's policy of zero interest rates has discouraged yen investments, with the carry trade of investors borrowing yen and investing in better-paying currencies (thus further pushing down the yen) estimated to be as large as $1 trillion. In February 2007, The Economist estimated that the yen was 15% undervalued against the dollar, and as much as 40% undervalued against the euro.

After the global economic crisis of 2008

However, this trend of depreciation reversed after the global economic crisis of 2008. Other major currencies, except the Swiss franc, have been declining relative to the yen.

On April 4, 2013, the Bank of Japan announced that they would expand their asset purchase program by $1.4 trillion in two years. The Bank of Japan hopes to bring Japan from deflation to inflation, aiming for 2% inflation. The number of purchases is so large that it is expected to double the money supply, but this move has sparked concerns that the authorities in Japan are deliberately devaluing the yen to boost exports. However, the commercial sector in Japan worried that the devaluation would trigger an increase in import prices, especially for energy and raw materials.

Redenomination proposals
Numerous proposals have been made since the 1990s to redenominate the yen by introducing a new unit or new yen, equal to 100 yen, and nearly worth one U.S. dollar. This has not happened to date, since the yen remains trusted globally despite its low unit value, and due to the huge costs of reissuing new currency and updating currency-reading hardware. The negative impact of postponing upgrades to various computer software until redenomination occurs, in particular, was also cited.

Coins

Coins were introduced in 1870, in silver 5, 10, 20 and 50 sen and 1 yen, and gold 2, 5, 10 and 20 yen. Gold 1 yen were introduced in 1871, followed by copper 1 rin, 1 and 2 sen in 1873.

Cupronickel 5 sen coins were introduced in 1889. In 1897, the silver 1 yen coin was demonetized and the sizes of the gold coins were reduced by 50%, with 5, 10 and 20 yen coins issued. After 1920, all previous series of silver coins were discontinued in favor of cupro-nickel 10 sen and reduced-size silver 50 sen coins.

Production of silver 50 sen coins ceased in 1938, after which a variety of base metals were used to produce 1, 5 and 10 sen coins during the Second World War. Clay 5 and 10 sen coins were produced in 1945, but not issued for circulation.

After the war, brass 50 sen, 1 and 5 yen were introduced between 1946 and 1948. The current-type holed brass 5 yen was introduced in 1949, the bronze 10 yen in 1951, and the aluminum 1 yen in 1955.

In 1955 the first unholed, nickel 50 yen was introduced. In 1957, silver 100 yen pieces were introduced, followed by the holed 50 yen coin in 1959. These were replaced in 1967 by the current cupro-nickel 100 yen along with a smaller 50 yen.

In 1982, the first cupronickel 500 yen coin was introduced. Alongside with the 5 Swiss franc coin, the 500 yen coin is one of the highest-valued coin to be used regularly in the world, with value of US$4.5 . Because of its high face value, the 500 yen coin has been a favorite target for counterfeiters, resulting in the issuance in 2000 of the second nickel-brass 500 yen coin with added security features. Continued counterfeiting of the latter resulted in the issuance in 2021 of the third bi-metallic 500 yen coin with more improvements in security features.

The observe side of all coins shows the coin's value in kanji as well as the country name (through 1945, ; after 1945,  (except for the current 5-yen coin with the country name on the reverse). The reverse side of all coins shows the year of mintage, which is not shown in Gregorian calendar years, but instead in the regnal year of the current emperor's reign. For reference:
 Coins minted in 1900 bear the year 明治 (Meiji) 33, the 33rd year of Emperor Meiji's reign
 Coins minted in 1920 bear the year 大正 (Taisho) 9, the 9th year of Emperor Taisho's reign
 Coins minted in 1980 bear the year 昭和 (Showa) 55, the 55th year of Emperor Hirohito's reign
 Coins minted in 2000 bear the year 平成 (Heisei) 12, the 12th year of Emperor Akihito's reign
 Coins minted in 2020 bear the year 令和 (Reiwa) 2, the 2nd year of Emperor Naruhito's reign

Due to the great differences in style, size, weight and the pattern present on the edge of the coin they are easy for people with visual impairments to tell apart from one another.

Commemorative coins have been minted on various occasions in base metal, silver and gold. The first of these were silver ¥100 and ¥1,000 Summer Olympic coins issued for the 1964 games. The largest issuance by denomination and total face value were 10 million gold coins of ¥100,000 denomination for the 60th anniversary of reign of the Shōwa Emperor in 1986, totalling ¥1 trillion and utilizing 200,000 kg fine gold. ¥500 commemorative coins have been regularly issued since 1985. In 2008 commemorative ¥500 and ¥1,000 coins were issued featuring Japan's 47 prefectures. Even though all commemorative coins can be spent like ordinary (non-commemorative) coins, they do not normally circulate, and ¥100,000 coins are treated with caution due to the discovery of counterfeits.

The 1 yen coin is made out of 100% aluminum and can float on water if placed correctly.

Banknotes

The issuance of yen banknotes began in 1872, two years after the currency was introduced. Denominations have ranged from 1 yen to 10,000 yen; since 1984, the lowest-valued banknote is the 1,000 yen note. Before and during World War II, various bodies issued banknotes in yen, such as the Ministry of Finance and the Imperial Japanese National Bank. The Allied forces also issued some notes shortly after the war. Since then, the Bank of Japan has been the exclusive note issuing authority. The bank has issued five series after World War II.

Japan is generally considered a cash-based society, with 38% of payments in Japan made by cash in 2014. Possible explanations are that cash payments protect one's privacy, merchants do not have to wait for payment, and it does not carry any negative connotation like credit.

At present, portraits of people from the Meiji period and later are printed on Japanese bank notes. The reason for this is that from the viewpoint of preventing forgery, it is desirable to use a precise photograph as an original rather than a painting for a portrait.

Series E banknotes
Series E banknotes were introduced in 2004 in ¥1000, ¥5000, and ¥10,000 denominations. The EURion constellation pattern is present in the designs.

Series F banknotes
On April 9, 2019, Finance Minister Tarō Asō announced new designs for Series F banknotes ¥1000, ¥5000, and ¥10,000 notes, for use beginning in 2024. The ¥1000 bill will feature Kitasato Shibasaburō and The Great Wave off Kanagawa, the ¥5000 bill will feature Tsuda Umeko and Wisteria flowers, and the ¥10,000 bill will feature Shibusawa Eiichi and Tokyo Station. The Ministry decided to not redesign the ¥2000 note due to low circulation.

Determinants of value

Beginning in December 1931, Japan gradually shifted from the gold standard system to the managed currency system.

The relative value of the yen is determined in foreign exchange markets by the economic forces of supply and demand. The supply of the yen in the market is governed by the desire of yen holders to exchange their yen for other currencies to purchase goods, services, or assets. The demand for the yen is governed by the desire of foreigners to buy goods and services in Japan and by their interest in investing in Japan (buying yen-denominated real and financial assets).

Since the 1990s, the Bank of Japan, the country's central bank, has kept interest rates low to spur economic growth. Short-term lending rates have responded to this monetary relaxation and fell from 3.7% to 1.3% between 1993 and 2008. Low interest rates combined with a ready liquidity for the yen prompted investors to borrow money in Japan and invest it in other countries (a practice known as carry trade). This has helped to keep the value of the yen low compared to other currencies.

International reserve currency

The special drawing rights (SDR) valuation is an IMF basket of the world's major reserve currencies, including the Japanese yen. Its share of 8.33% as of 2016 has declined from 18% as of 2000.

Historical exchange rate
Before the war commenced, the yen traded on an average of 3.6 yen to the dollar. After the war the yen went as low as 600 yen per USD in 1947, as a result of currency overprinting in order to fund the war, and afterwards to fund the reconstruction.

When MacArthur and the US forces entered Japan in 1945, they decreed an official conversion rate of 15 yen to the USD. Within 1945–1946: the rate tanked to 50 yen to the USD because of the ongoing inflation. During the first half of 1946, the rate fluctuated to 66 yen to the USD and eventually plummeting to 600 yen to the dollar by 1947 because of the failure of the economic remedies. Eventually, the peg was officially moved to 270 yen to the dollar in 1948 before being adjusted again from 1949 to 1971 to 360 yen to the dollar.

Beginning in 2022 the Yen rate has become increasingly weaker with each passing month. The reasoning behind this is the US moving towards higher interest rates, while Japan remains "ultra-low". Other factors include the strength of the US economy and its labor market, while Japan continues to lag behind its peers to bring its economy back to its pre-pandemic size. Japan’s trade balance staying in the red is also likely feeding into the weaker yen.

The table below shows the monthly average of the U.S. dollar–yen spot rate (JPY per USD) at 17:00 JST:

See also
 Japan Mint
 Japanese military currency
 Economy of Japan
 Capital flows in Japan
 Monetary and fiscal policy of Japan
 Balance of payments accounts of Japan (1960–90)
 List of countries by leading trade partners
 List of the largest trading partners of Japan
 Korean Empire won (1902–1910)

Older currency
 Japanese mon (currency)
 Koban (coin)
 Ryō (Japanese coin)
 Wadōkaichin

Notes

References

Citations

Sources

Further reading

External links

 Japanese currency FAQ in Currency Museum, Bank of Japan
 Images of historic and modern Japanese bank notes
 Catalog of the coins of Japan (Numista)
 Chart: US dollar in yen) (in German)
 Chart: 100 yen in euros (in German)
 Historical Currency Converter Estimates the historical value of the yen into other currencies

 
1871 introductions
Circulating currencies
Currency symbols
Japanese business terms
Currencies of Japan
Denominations (currency)